A stub axle or stud axle is either one of two front axles in a rear wheel drive vehicle, or one of the two rear axles in a front wheel drive vehicle. In a rear wheel drive vehicle this axle is capable of angular movement about the kingpin for steering the vehicle.

The stub or stud axle is named so because it resembles the shape of a stub or stud, like a truncated end of an axle, short in shape and blunt.
There are four general designs:
 Elliot stub axle
 Reversed Elliot
 Lemoine
 Lemoine inverted

Vehicle parts